Widlund is a Swedish surname. Notable people with the surname include:

Eivar Widlund (1905–1968), Swedish football goalkeeper 
Maj Jacobsson (later Widlund, 1909–1996), Swedish athlete
Olof B. Widlund (born 1938), Swedish-American mathematician

Swedish-language surnames